Vincent de Paul Gondjout is a Gabonese politician. He is a member of the Gabonese Democratic Party (Parti démocratique gabonais, PDG), and is a Deputy of the National Assembly of Gabon representing the Commune of Libreville. He is the son of Paul Gondjout, who was a prominent figure in Gabon in the 1960s.

References

Members of the National Assembly of Gabon
Gabonese Democratic Party politicians
Living people
Year of birth missing (living people)
People from Libreville
21st-century Gabonese people